Hinkelien Schreuder (born 13 February 1984) is a former butterfly, freestyle and backstroke swimmer from The Netherlands, who also competed in the medley events.  Schreuder won the Olympic gold medal in the 4×100 freestyle relay at the 2008 Olympics in Beijing, and a silver in the same event at the 2012 Summer Olympics. She is a former world record holder in the 100 m individual medley, and former European record holder in the 50 m butterfly short course.

Personal bests

See also 
 Dutch records in swimming
 European records in swimming
 List of world records in swimming

References

External links
 Profile op www.zwemkroniek.com 
 
 
 
 

1984 births
Living people
People from Hof van Twente
World record setters in swimming
Olympic swimmers of the Netherlands
Swimmers at the 2008 Summer Olympics
Olympic gold medalists for the Netherlands
Dutch female freestyle swimmers
World Aquatics Championships medalists in swimming
Dutch female backstroke swimmers
Dutch female medley swimmers
Dutch female butterfly swimmers
Swimmers at the 2012 Summer Olympics
Olympic silver medalists for the Netherlands
Medalists at the FINA World Swimming Championships (25 m)
European Aquatics Championships medalists in swimming
Medalists at the 2012 Summer Olympics
Medalists at the 2008 Summer Olympics
Olympic gold medalists in swimming
Olympic silver medalists in swimming
Sportspeople from Overijssel
21st-century Dutch women